Matmari also spelled as Matamari is a village in the Raichur taluk of Raichur district in the Indian state of Karnataka. Matmari is located south of District Headquarters Raichur town. Matmari Railway Station lies on Guntakal-Solapur railway line. There is an ancient temple of Sri Veerabhadreshwara Swamy in Matmari.

Demographics
 India census, Matmari had a population of 4,712 with 2,392 males and 2,320 females and 941 Households.

See also
Mantralayam
Devadurga
Lingasugur
Sindhanur
Raichur

References

External links

Villages in Raichur district